Daxinggong station, is an interchange station of Line 2 and Line 3 of the Nanjing Metro. It started operations on 28 May 2010 along with the rest of Line 2. The interchange with Line 3 opened along with the rest of that line on 1 April 2015.

The station is decorated with a Chinese New Year theme.

Around the station
 Centre Hotel
 Jiangsu Art Gallery
 Nanjing Great Hall of the People
 Nanjing Library
 New Century Plaza Tower A
 Presidential Palace

References

Railway stations in Jiangsu
Railway stations in China opened in 2010
Nanjing Metro stations